is a passenger railway station in the city of Isesaki, Gunma Prefecture, Japan, operated by East Japan Railway Company (JR East).

Lines
Kunisada Station is served by the Ryōmō Line, and is located 63.3 km from the terminus of the line at Oyama Station.

Station layout
The station consists of one side platform and one island platform connected by a footbridge. The station is staffed.

Platforms

History
Kunisada Station was opened on 20 November 1889. The station was absorbed into the JR East network upon the privatization of the Japanese National Railways (JNR) on 1 April 1987.

Passenger statistics
In fiscal 2019, the station was used by an average of 1564 passengers daily (boarding passengers only).

Surrounding area
Grave of Kunisada Chūji
Kunisada Post Office
Former Azuma village hall

See also
 List of railway stations in Japan

References

External links

 JR East Station information 

Railway stations in Gunma Prefecture
Ryōmō Line
Stations of East Japan Railway Company
Railway stations in Japan opened in 1889
Isesaki, Gunma